This is a list of legislatures or the law making branch of a government that appear in fiction. It does not include legislatures of non-fictional governments.

Fictional governments